The Noirmoutier Bridge is a bridge located on the west coast of France in the department of Vendée, built in the early 1970s to connect the island of Noirmoutier to the mainland. Before it opened, a maritime shuttle service ran between the La Fosse pier on the island and Fromentine pier on the mainland.

Description
The bridge connects the towns of Barbâtre, on the south of the island of Noirmoutier, to La Barre-de-Monts, on the north-Vendée mainland coast, and crosses the Strait of Fromentine. Built by the Dumez and Sacer companies under the project management and financial direction of the department, its first stone was laid on 12 May 1969 in Fromentine and it was opened to traffic on 7 July 1971, in order to provide a replacement for the passage du Gois (a submersible roadway at high tide). An enamel plaque was placed at the top against the railing to recall the event.

In 1977, an increase in the toll rate led to demonstrations by island users, with traffic blockading the entrances to the bridge, raising of barricades and the intervention of a company of CRS in response. The toll was removed from 1 July 1994, 
 
After an appraisal carried out in 2016, restoration work aimed in particular at a better waterproofing of the concrete has been carried out since 2017.

Technical characteristics

The technical characteristics of the Noirmoutier bridge are as follows:
Total length: 
Main central span: 
Deck width: 
Height under main apron: 
Mainland access viaduct: 4 continuous spans with a span of 
Main viaduct: 3 continuous spans 

The piles are largely based in the ground, to rest on solid ground. The foundations are approximately double the visible height of the piers. These are hollow, except those of the central bay, in anticipation of collisions with possible boats.

The construction was carried out by assembling the segments using a launching gantry making it possible to pose the corbelling symmetrically on each side of the supports. The 258 prefabricated segments unit weight is approximately 50tonnes.

The manufacture of the piers used  of concrete,  of formwork and 250 tonnes of high-grade steel. The deck required  of concrete, 160 tonnes of reinforced concrete steel and 180 tonnes of steel cables for the prestressing.

References

External links 
 Video: 

Box girder bridges in France
Bridges completed in 1971
Buildings and structures in Vendée
Transport in Pays de la Loire
Former toll bridges in France